Ivan Stoyanov (born 9 July 1991) is a Bulgarian footballer who plays as a defender.

References

External links
 

1991 births
Living people
Bulgarian footballers
Association football defenders
PFC Pirin Gotse Delchev players
First Professional Football League (Bulgaria) players